Lynda Garland (born 13 October 1955) is a scholar and professor at the University of Queensland. Her research focuses on females images in the Late Antiquity period and Byzantine Society.

Biography 

Professor Lynda Garland is currently the Honorary Research Associate Professor in Classics at the School of Historical and Philosophical Inquiry at the University of Queensland, Australia. She was the professor of Ancient and Medieval History at the University of New England (Australia). Garland has also been teaching at the University of New England, New South Wales and working as the Head of the School of Humanities at the University of New England, Armidale.

Professor Garland studies the history from the Classical Antiquity to the Early Middle Ages. Her own research focuses on women, especially the imperial princesses and empresses, and their relationship and status within the family and society in the Byzantine period. At the same time, she has collaborated with Professor Matthew Dillion at the University of New England and collected social and historical documents of Ancient Greece and Rome. The primary documents are translated into English and compiled into sourcebooks for students and scholars in Greek and Roman History to study and use for reference.

Books 
Ancient Rome: social and historical documents from the early Republic to the death of Augustus(2015). 

Questions of Gender in Byzantine Society(2013). 

The Ancient Greeks: History and Culture from Archaic Times to the Death of Alexander(2012). 

Basileia: Essays on Imperium and Culture in Honour of E.M. and M.J. Jeffreys(2011). 

Byzantine Women AD 800–1200: Varieties of Experience(2006). 

Ancient Rome: from the Early Republic to the Assassination of Julius Caesar(2005). 

Byzantine Empresses: Women and Power in Byzantium AD 527-1204(1999). 

Conformity and Non-Conformity in Byzantium(1997). 

Social and Historical Documents from Archaic Times to the Death of Socrates (c. 800–399 BC) (1994).

References 

1955 births
Living people
Women Byzantinists
Women medievalists
Byzantinists
Academic staff of the University of Queensland